Eupithecia macfarlandi is a moth in the family Geometridae first described by Clifford D. Ferris in 2007. It is found in canyons on the east side of the Huachuca Mountains in the US state of Arizona. The habitat consists of oak and oak-conifer forests.

The length of the forewings is 9–9.5 mm for males and 9.5–11.0 mm for females. The forewings are medium-to-dark gray. The hindwings are the same color, with alternating pale and dark banding. Adults are on wing from late August to mid-September.

Etymology
The species is named in honor of Noel McFarland in recognition of his many contributions to the study of south-eastern Arizona moths.

References

Moths described in 2007
macfarlandi
Moths of North America